The canton of Perthes is a French former administrative division, located in the arrondissement of Melun, in the Seine-et-Marne département (Île-de-France région). It was disbanded following the French canton reorganisation which came into effect in March 2015.

Demographics

Composition 
The canton of Perthes was composed of 14 communes:

Arbonne-la-Forêt
Barbizon
Boissise-le-Roi
Cély
Chailly-en-Bière
Dammarie-les-Lys
Fleury-en-Bière
Perthes
Pringy
Saint-Fargeau-Ponthierry
Saint-Germain-sur-École
Saint-Martin-en-Bière
Saint-Sauveur-sur-École
Villiers-en-Bière

See also
Cantons of the Seine-et-Marne department
Communes of the Seine-et-Marne department

References

Perthes
2015 disestablishments in France
States and territories disestablished in 2015